Enke is a surname. Notable people with the surname include: 

Christie G. Enke, American chemist
Fred Enke (1897–1985), American football, basketball, and baseball coach
Fred Enke (American football) (born 1924), American football player
Hartmut Enke (1952–2005), German musician
Karin Enke (born 1961), German speed skater
Konrad Enke (born 1934), German swimmer
Robert Enke (1977–2009), German football player
Werner Enke (born 1941), German actor

See also
133552 Itting-Enke (2003 UJ4) is a main-belt asteroid discovered on October 16, 2003, at Turtle Star Observatory
Den glade enke i Trangvik (English: The merry widow of Trangvik) is a 1927 Norwegian silent drama film directed by Harry Ivarson